Amable Éno, dit Deschamps (April 27, 1785 – July 22, 1875) was a political figure in Quebec. He represented L'Assomption from 1830 to 1834 in the Legislative Assembly of Lower Canada as a supporter of the Parti patriote. His name also appears as Amable Deschamps.

He was born in L'Assomption, Quebec, the son of Jean-Baptiste Hénault dit Deschamps and Marie-Victoire Limoges. Originally working as a blacksmith, Éno, dit Deschamps later became a farmer at Repentigny. He married Marie-Louise Hétu in 1812. He served as an officer in the militia, reaching the rank of lieutenant-colonel, and was justice of the peace. Amable Éno, dit Deschamps voted in support of the Ninety-Two Resolutions. He was defeated by Jean-Baptiste Meilleur when he ran for reelection in 1834. He died in Repentigny at the age of 90.

References 

1785 births
1875 deaths
Members of the Legislative Assembly of Lower Canada
Canadian justices of the peace